The Blackburn H.S.T.10 (sometimes known as the Blackburn B-9) was a 1930s British twin-engined commercial monoplane, designed and built by Blackburn Aircraft at Brough, East Yorkshire.

Design and development
The H.S.T.10 was a low-wing cantilever monoplane powered by two Napier Rapier VI engines. It had a retractable conventional landing gear with an enclosed cabin for two pilots and twelve passengers. It was fitted with a single-spar all-metal wing. The single tubular spar, known as the Blackburn-Duncanson, had previously been tested on a Blackburn Segrave Claimed to be lighter than a two spar design while also stiff in "torsion and bending", the spar also served as the fuel tank. 

Intended to be "high speed" by careful attention to shape and removing "protuberances" with retractable undercarriage, the expected performance was 320 miles with two pilots and twelve passengers which increased to 1000 miles with both pilots and five passengers.

The pilots had individual rudder pedals but a single "handle" on the central control column which could be swung in front of either pilot seat. At the rear of the aircraft was a toilet and a  luggage space. Configurations drawn up by Blackburn included 12- and 8-seat passenger cabins or 4 bunks/stretchers as a medical transport.

The prototype used test serial B-9. In 1937, the project was abandoned, and B-9 was given to Loughborough College as an instructional airframe.

Specifications

References

Notes

Sources

H.S.T.10
1930s British airliners
Low-wing aircraft
Twin piston-engined tractor aircraft